The Second Battle of Manzanillo was a naval engagement of the Spanish–American War on 1 July 1898. Two American gunboats attempted unsuccessfully to destroy the Spanish ships in the harbor of Manzanillo, Cuba.

The battle
The  and  arrived at Manzanillo on 1 July expecting to find an American squadron, but did not know that the squadron had fought a battle in the harbor and retired the previous day. Adolph Marix, in command, nonetheless decided to follow orders and sailed the two ships into the bay to capture or destroy any enemy shipping there. In the harbor, the American ships came across several small vessels including the  gunboats Estrella and Guantánamo, the  Delgado Parejo, and a barracks ship. The Americans then proceeded to open fire on the vessels but could not get close enough to destroy them, due to the shallow water that lay in between the harbor and the two warships. Not only did the Spanish gunboats return fire, but also infantry and artillery from the shore.

The Americans were outnumbered, and after Scorpion had been hit 12 times the attackers withdrew. Osceola was not hit and the Americans reported no casualties, while Spanish casualties were three men wounded aboard the pontoon María.

Aftermath
As had occurred the day before, the Spanish had managed to repel the American squadron. Wrote one American sailor:

Scorpion and Osceola met the American squadron which had attacked the previous day and waited for reinforcements to arrive, before finally managing to destroy the Spanish naval force at Manzanillo on 18 July.

Order of battle

United States

Armed tug
  

Patrol yacht
 

Spain

Gunboats

 Estrella 
 Guantánamo
 Delgado Parejo

Pontoons

 Maria
 Cuba Española
 Guardián

Notes

Sources
 
 "GUNBOATS ENGAGE SPANIARDS", The New York Times. July 9, 1898.
 "MARIX AT MANZANILLO", The New York Times. July 25, 1898.
 

Naval battles of the Spanish–American War
Battles involving Cuba
Battle of Manzanillo 02
Battle of Manzanillo 02
Conflicts in 1898
Battle of Manzanillo 02
Battles and conflicts without fatalities